Markham is an English surname. Notable people with the surname include:

 Sir Albert Hastings Markham (1841–1918), a British explorer, author, and naval officer
 Algernon Augustus Markham (1869–1949), an Anglican bishop
Sir Arthur Markham, 1st Baronet (1866–1916), British industrialist and MP
Arthur Markham (cyclist) (c. 1860 – 1917), winner of the first formal cycle race held in Britain
 Bernard Markham (1907–1984), an Anglican Bishop in the third quarter of the 20th Century
 Beryl Markham (1902–1986), a British-born Kenyan writer, pilot and horse trainer
 Bridget Markham (1579–1609), a British courtier
 Sir Clements Markham (1830–1916), a President of the Royal Geographical Society
 Col Markham (1940–2020), an Australian politician
 Curtis Markham (born 1959), an American NASCAR driver in all three top series
 Dale Markham (born 1957), a National Football League player
 David Markham (1913–1983), a British actor
 E. A. Markham (1939–2008), a poet and writer, born in Harris, Montserrat
 Edward Murphy Markham (1877–1950), a United States Army general
 Edwin Markham (1852–1940), an American poet
 Fish Markham (1924–2000), a South African cricketer 
 Frank Markham (1897–1975), a British politician
 Fred L. Markham (1902–1984), an American architect in the early 20th century
 George H. Markham (1837–1920), American politician
 Gervase Markham (c. 1568 – 1637), an English poet and writer
 Griffin Markham (d. aft. 1644), an English soldier
 Harry Markham, an English rugby league footballer of the 1950s
 Henry Markham (1840–1923), a United States Representative and 18th Governor of California
 Henry Vaughan Markham (1897–1946), British civil servant
 Ian Markham (born 1962), an American academic
 J. David Markham (born 1945), American educator and historian
 James Markham Marshall (1764–1848), a United States federal judge
 Jerry Markham, a leading scholar on business organizations and securities regulation in the United States
 John Markham (judge) (died 1479), an English judge and Chief Justice
 John Markham (Royal Navy officer) (1761–1827), a Royal Navy officer during the Napoleonic Wars
 June Markham, a British ice dancer
 Kika Markham (born 1940), a British actress
 Mansfield Markham (born 1905), a British film producer and director
 Monte Markham (born 1935), an American actor
 Paul Markham (1930–2019), an American lawyer
 Pauline Markham (1847–1919), a singer and burlesque dancer during the period of Civil War in the United States
 Petra Markham (born 1947), a British actress
 Pigmeat Markham (real name Dewey Markham, 1904–1981), an African-American entertainer
 Ray Markham (born 1958), a professional ice hockey player
 Reuben H. Markham (1887–1949), an American journalist
 Richard Markham, an English pianist 
 Robert Markham (disambiguation), multiple people
 Rory Markham (born 1982), an American professional mixed martial arts fighter
 Thomas Francis Markham, American Roman Catholic bishop
 Violet Markham (1872–1959), a writer, social reformer and administrator
 William Markham (disambiguation), multiple people

Fictional characters
 Markham (Stargate), a USMC non-commissioned officer played by Joseph May in Stargate Atlantis
 Ben and Stephanie Markham, two characters in the All Saints  Australian medical drama series
 Cylla Markham, in the Skullbuster comics series
 Grant Markham, in the Doctor Who novels
 Dame Sally Markham, in British television and radio sketch series Little Britain 
 Lieutenant Markham, in Gunga Din
 Ulf Reichstein-Markham, a recurring character from the Man-Kzin Wars series of books

English toponymic surnames